The Minnewaska State Park Preserve is a  preserve located on the Shawangunk Ridge in Ulster County, New York on US 44/NY 55,  west of New York State Route 299. The park, which features scenic overlooks of the nearby Catskill Mountains, is primarily used for picnicking, hiking, mountain biking, snowshoeing and swimming. The park is managed by the Palisades Interstate Park Commission and the New York State Office of Parks, Recreation and Historic Preservation.

Four of the five sky lakes on the Shawangunk Ridge lie within the preserve: Lake Minnewaska, Lake Awosting, Mud Pond (also known as Lake Haseco), and Lake Maratanza; Mohonk Lake is on the property of the Mohonk Mountain House to the north of Minnewaska.

History

Originally part of Albert and Alfred Smiley's Mohonk Mountain House property, the Minnewaska Mountain House, or Cliff House, was built in 1879 overlooking Lake Minnewaska; it could accommodate 225 guests. After managing and developing Mohonk's early growth for ten years, twin Alfred H. Smiley purchased and developed Minnewaska separate from Mohonk, but the brothers exchanged courtesies to each other's guests. A second hotel, Wildmere, accommodated 350 guests. In 1955, Kenneth B. Phillips Sr., the Minnewaska general manager, bought the property from the Smiley family. Cliff House was abandoned in 1972 due to maintenance costs; it burned to the ground in 1978. Wildmere closed in 1979 and burned to the ground in 1986.

After years of wrangling over commercial development proposals and lawsuits to block development, New York State bought the property in 1987 and opened the Minnewaska State Park Preserve in 1993. A significant expansion of  occurred in 1996 when the Open Space Institute transferred acreage to the park preserve from the old Ellenville watershed lands, now called Sam's Point Preserve. The preserve was managed by the Nature Conservancy and by the Open Space Institute until April 2015, at which time management was transferred to the New York State Office of Parks, Recreation and Historic Preservation and the Palisades Interstate Park Commission.

Located within the Minnewaska State Park Preserve and neighboring Mohonk Preserve is the Trapps Mountain Hamlet Historic District, listed on the National Register of Historic Places in 2000.

Early 21st-century expansion
In March 2006, an additional  were added to the preserve as a result of action by a coalition of conservation groups including the New York - New Jersey Trail Conference, Open Space Institute, and Nature Conservancy. The success was made possible in part because the real estate partnership that sought to develop the Awosting Reserve property collapsed due to an internal financial dispute. To settle this dispute among the partners, a court ordered that the property be sold. The Trust for Public Land purchased the property for $17 million and immediately turned the land over to New York State.

Ecological characteristics
Unique communities such as ice cave talus, pitch pine-oak-heath rocky summit, and extensive chestnut oak forest comprise Minnewaska State Park Preserve. These ecosystems host a variety of plants and animals that are uncommon in New York State. Wildlife such as the timber rattlesnake (Crotalus horridus), bobcat (Lynx rufus) and New York State's only documented occurrence of the noctuid moth Zale curema reside within the preserve.

Swimming in Lake Minnewaska
Swimming was allowed throughout the entirety of Lake Minnewaska and surrounding Lake Awosting and Peterskill areas until 1987 when New York State purchased the land and closed the lake to public recreation. In 1988 under the guidance of Helga Schwartz and through numerous petitions, swimming was reinstated in a small roped off area.

On April 19, 2000 Judy Mage, Myriam Miedzian, and Ellen James met with Park officials and the PIPC (Palisades Interstate Park Commission) to present proposals for the allowance of distance swimming on the lake. As a result of this meeting the designated swim area in the lake was increased and the closing time for swimming was extended by half an hour.

On June 11, 2000 SWIM (Swim Without Interference at Minnewaska) was created to attempt to bring back swimming throughout the entire lake. After much debate and negotiations with Parks officials, SWIM proposed the formation of a club where members would be tested for swimming ability, purchase insurance cards, and sign release of liability forms. The group was able to secure a second swimming area consisting of a 200-yard buoyed cable that runs parallel to the shoreline for distance swimming.

In Spring 2002 SWIM became the Minnewaska Distance Swimmers Association (MDSA) and signed up 430 members its first year. As of 2009 the MDSA has close to 700 members.

Image gallery

References

External links
 New York State Parks: Minnewaska State Park Preserve
 Lake Minnewaska.org
 Hiking at Lake Minnewaska
 NY-NJTC: Minnewaska State Park Preserve Trail Details and Info

 Lake Minnewaska Mountain Houses

Shawangunks
Palisades Interstate Park system
Climbing areas of the United States
Gardiner, New York
Wawarsing, New York
Protected areas established in 1993
Parks in Ulster County, New York
State parks of New York (state)
Nature centers in New York (state)
U.S. Route 44
1993 establishments in New York (state)